Teetotalism is the practice or promotion of total personal abstinence from the consumption of alcohol, specifically in alcoholic drinks. A person who practices (and possibly advocates) teetotalism is called a teetotaler or teetotaller, or is simply said to be teetotal. Globally, almost half of adults do not drink alcohol (excluding those who used to drink but have stopped). A number of temperance organisations have been founded in order to promote teetotalism and provide spaces for non-drinkers to socialise.

Etymology
According to the Online Etymology Dictionary, the tee- in teetotal is the letter T, so it is actually t-total, though it was never spelled that way. The word is first recorded in 1832 in a general sense in an American source, and in 1833 in England in the context of abstinence. Since at first it was used in other contexts as an emphasised form of total, the tee- is presumably a reduplication of the first letter of total, much as contemporary idiom today might say "total with a capital T".

The teetotalism movement was first started in Preston, England, in the early 19th century. The Preston Temperance Society was founded in 1833 by Joseph Livesey, who was to become a leader of the temperance movement and the author of The Pledge: "We agree to abstain from all liquors of an intoxicating quality whether ale, porter, wine, or ardent spirits, except as medicine." Today, a number of temperance organisations exist that promote teetotalism as a virtue.

Richard Turner, a member of the society Preston Temperance Society, is credited with using the existing slang word, "teetotally", for abstinence from all intoxicating liquors. One anecdote describes a meeting of the society in 1833, at which Turner in giving a speech said, "I'll be reet down out-and-out t-t-total for ever and ever." Walter William Skeat noted that the Turner anecdote had been recorded by temperance advocate Joseph Livesey, and posited that the term may have been inspired by the teetotum; however, James B. Greenough stated that "nobody ever thought teetotum and teetotaler were etymologically connected."

A variation on the above account is found on the pages of The Charleston Observer: 

According to historian Daniel Walker Howe (What Hath God Wrought: The Transformation of America, 1815–1848, 2007) the term was derived from the practice of American preacher and temperance advocate Lyman Beecher. He would take names at his meetings of people who pledged alcoholic temperance and noted those who pledged total abstinence with a T. Such persons became known as Teetotallers.

Reasons

Some common reasons for choosing teetotalism are psychological, religious, health, medical, philosophical, social, political, past alcoholism, or sometimes it is simply a matter of taste or preference. When at drinking establishments, teetotalers (or teetotallers) either abstain from drinking totally or consume non-alcoholic beverages such as water, juice, tea, coffee, non-alcoholic soft drinks, virgin drinks, mocktails, and alcohol-free beer.

Most teetotaler organisations also demand from their members that they do not promote or produce alcoholic intoxicants.

Religion

Abstention from alcohol is a tenet of a number of religious faiths, such as Islam; Hinduism; Jainism; the Swaminarayans; Sikhism; Baháʼís; Meivazhi-ites; Guta Ra Mwari (Zvimiso) and the Assemblies of God.

"Khamr" is the term for all intoxicants which are prohibited in Islam. (See )

Similarly, one of the five precepts of Buddhism is abstaining from intoxicating substances that disturb the peace and self-control of the mind, but it is formulated as a training rule to be assumed voluntarily rather than as a commandment.

Many Christian groups, such as Methodists and Quakers, are often associated with teetotalism due to their traditionally strong support for temperance movements, as well as prohibition. And a number of Christian denominations forbid the consumption of alcohol, or recommend the non-consumption thereof, including certain Anabaptist denominations such as the Mennonites (both Old Order Mennonites and Conservative Mennonites), Church of the Brethren, Beachy Amish and New Order Amish, in addition to Latter-Day Saints, Seventh-day Adventists, and Holiness Pentecostals. Many members of these religious groups are also required to refrain from selling such products. A free translation of the New Testament, the Purified Translation of the Bible (2000), translates in a way that promotes teetotalism. However, the term 'wine' (and similar terms) being consumed by God's people occurs over two hundred times in both the Old and New Testament.

With respect to Methodism, the Church of the Nazarene and Wesleyan Methodist Church, both denominations in the Wesleyan-Arminian tradition, teach abstinence from alcohol. Members of denominations in the conservative holiness movement, such as the Allegheny Wesleyan Methodist Connection and Evangelical Wesleyan Church, practice temperance and teetotalism, thus abstaining from alcohol and other drugs. The Book of Discipline of the Immanuel Missionary Church, a Methodist denomination, states:

Uniformed members of the Salvation Army ("soldiers" and "officers") make a promise on joining the movement to observe lifelong abstinence from alcohol. This dates back to the early years of the organisation, and the missionary work among alcoholics.

Conservative Anabaptist denominations, such as the Dunkard Brethren Church, teach:

With respect to Restorationist Christianity, members of certain groups within the Christian Science and Latter Day Saint movements abstain from the consumption of alcohol.

Eastern Orthodox Church, the Roman Catholic Church, the Lutheran Churches, Oriental Orthodox Churches, and the Anglican Communion all require wine in their central religious rite of the Eucharist (Holy Communion). Churches in the Methodist tradition require that "pure, unfermented juice of the grape" be used in the sacrament of Holy Communion.

In the Gospel of Luke (1:13–15), the angel that announces the birth of John the Baptist foretells that "he shall be great in the sight of the Lord, and shall drink neither wine nor strong drink; and he shall be filled with the Holy Ghost, even from his mother's womb".

Some Christians choose to practice teetotalism throughout the Lent season, thus giving up alcoholic beverages as their Lenten sacrifice.

Research on non-drinkers
Dominic Conroy and Richard de Visser published research in Psychology and Health which studied strategies used by college students who would like to resist peer pressure to drink alcohol in social settings. The research hinted that students are less likely to give in to peer pressure if they have strong friendships and make a decision not to drink before social interactions.

A 2015 study by the Office for National Statistics showed that young Britons were more likely to be teetotalers than their parents.

According to Global Status Report on Alcohol and Health, published by WHO in 2011, close to half of the world's adult population (45 per cent) are lifetime abstainers. The Eastern Mediterranean Region, consisting of the Muslim countries in the Middle East and North Africa, is by far the lowest alcohol consuming region in the world, both in terms of total adult per capita consumption and prevalence of non-drinkers, i.e., 87.8 per cent lifetime abstainers.

Notable teetotalers
The following is an alphabetical list of notable people who are now or were teetotalers during their lifetime. Some have abstained their entire lives, and others only became abstainers after a period of alcohol use. Members of religions that ban alcohol are not included.

Business
Anil AmbaniIndian businessman
Mukesh AmbaniIndian business magnate, chairman, managing director, and the largest shareholder of Reliance Industries Ltd. (RIL)
Joseph Cyril BamfordBritish businessman
P.T. BarnumAmerican showman and politician of the 19th Century remembered today for his popular circus.
Warren BuffettAmerican business magnate, investor, and philanthropist
John CadburyEnglish founder of Cadbury
Larry EllisonAmerican founder of Oracle Corporation
Ashok HindujaIndian businessman
Gopichand HindujaIndian-born British billionaire businessman and co-chairman of the Hinduja Group
Prakash HindujaIndian-born Swiss businessman
S. P. HindujaIndian-born British billionaire businessman, investor, and philanthropist
Jon Huntsman Sr.American founder of Huntsman Corporation
David MurdockAmerican chairman of Dole Food Company

Fashion
Emmanuelle AltFrench fashion editor
Tyra BanksAmerican television personality, model, businesswoman, producer, actress, and writer
Naomi CampbellEnglish model, actress, singer, and businesswoman
Tom FordAmerican fashion designer and filmmaker
Karl LagerfeldGerman fashion designer, creative director, artist and photographer
Anna WintourBritish-American journalist, who has served as editor-in-Chief of Vogue since 1988

Literature and journalism
Isaac AsimovAmerican writer and professor of biochemistry
Emil CioranRomanian philosopher and essayist
Arthur C. ClarkeEnglish science-fiction writer, science writer, futurist, inventor, undersea explorer, and television series host
H. P. LovecraftAmerican writer of weird, science, fantasy, and horror fiction
Teša TešanovićSerbian journalist and TV host
Lasantha WickrematungeSri Lankan journalist and politician

Music
A R RahmanIndian music composer, record producer, singer and songwriter
IllayarajaIndian musician, composer, arranger, conductor, orchestrator, instrumentalist, lyricist and singer
Ryan AdamsAmerican singer-songwriter, record producer, artist and poet
AkonSenegalese American singer, songwriter, record producer, and entrepreneur
Fiona AppleAmerican singer and songwriter
Jon BatisteAmerican singer, songwriter, musician, television personality, and former bandleader for The Late Show with Stephen Colbert
Susan BoyleScottish singer
Ian BrownEnglish singer and multi-instrumentalist
Jason Aalon ButlerAmerican musician and political activist
Julian CasablancasAmerican singer, best known as the lead vocalist and primary songwriter of rock band The Strokes
Max CavaleraBrazilian musician, singer and songwriter
Daniel CavanaghEnglish guitarist and singer who formed the band Anathema
Chuck DAmerican rapper, singer and songwriter
Eric ClaptonEnglish rock and blues guitarist, singer, and songwriter
Adam ClaytonEnglish-born Irish musician and bassist of the rock band U2
John ColtraneAmerican jazz saxophonist and composer
Alice Cooper American rock singer
Bethany CosentinoAmerican recording artist, best known as the lead singer of Best Coast
Eric DolphyAmerican jazz alto saxophonist, bass clarinetist, and flutist
Fatboy SlimEnglish musician, DJ, and record producer
Gucci ManeAmerican rapper and record executive
Ice-TAmerican rapper, songwriter, actor, and producer
J MascisAmerican singer, guitarist, and songwriter for Dinosaur Jr.
JmeBritish grime MC, songwriter, record producer, and DJ
John Mayer, American singer, songwriter and guitarist; sober since attending Canadian recording artist Drake's 30th birthday party in 2016.
John 5American guitarist for Rob Zombie and Marilyn Manson
EminemAmerican rapper and songwriter
Kendrick LamarAmerican rapper, songwriter, and record producer
Jennifer LopezAmerican singer, actress, and dancer
Royce da 5'9"American rapper, songwriter, and record producer
Gene SimmonsIsraeli-American musician, singer, and songwriter for rock band KISS
Dee SniderAmerican singer and songwriter and lead singer of the heavy metal band Twisted Sister
Lindsey StirlingAmerican violinist 
Jeff TweedyAmerican songwriter, musician, author, and record producer, best known as the lead singer of Wilco
Varg VikernesNorwegian black metal musician
Dave WakelingEnglish singer, songwriter, and musician, best known for his work with the band the Beat (known in North America as the English Beat) and General Public
Paul WellerEnglish singer-songwriter
Pharrell WilliamsAmerican rapper, record producer, singer, songwriter, and entrepreneur
Angus YoungAustralian musician, best known as the co-founder, lead guitarist, songwriter and sole constant original member of the hard rock band AC/DC
Rob ZombieAmerican singer, songwriter, filmmaker, and voice actor

Politics
Shinzo Abeformer Prime Minister of Japan
Prince Andrew, Duke of Yorkmember of the British royal family
Reubin AskewAmerican politician, who served as the 37th governor of Florida from 1971 to 1979
Ted Baillieuformer Australian politician who was Premier of Victoria from 2010 to 2013
John Bercowformer British politician and Speaker of the House of Commons
Hilary BennBritish Labour Party politician who has been the Member of Parliament for Leeds Central since a by-election in 1999
Tony BennBritish politician, writer and diarist who served as a Cabinet minister in the 1960s and 1970s
Joe Biden46th President of the United States
Cory BookerAmerican politician, attorney, and author who has served as the junior United States senator from New Jersey since 2013
George N. Briggs19th Governor of Massachusetts, from 1844 to 1851
George W. Bush43rd President of the United States
Pedro Castillo63rd President of Peru
Tyler Coweneconomist, political writer, and blogger
Morarji DesaiIndian independence activist and politician who served as the 4th Prime Minister of India between 1977 and 1979
John Diefenbaker13th prime minister of Canada
Edwin Edwards50th governor of Louisiana for four terms
Doug Ford26th premier of Ontario
George GallowayBritish politician, broadcaster, and writer
David Lloyd Georgeformer Prime Minister of the United Kingdom
Juan Vicente GómezVenezuelan military general and ruler of Venezuela from 1908 to 1935
Félix Houphouët-Boignyfirst president of Ivory Coast
Narendra Modi14th Prime minister of India
Vyacheslav MolotovSoviet politician (1890–1986), Statesman and Diplomat
Nicolas Sarkozyformer President of France
Yoshihide Sugaformer Prime Minister of Japan
Rishi Sunak Prime Minister of the United Kingdom
Donald Trump45th President of the United States, media personality, and businessman

Religion
Albert BarnesAmerican theologian, clergyman, abolitionist, temperance advocate, and author
Hugh Bournejoint founder of Primitive Methodism
William M. BranhamAmerican Christian minister and faith healer
Jerry FalwellAmerican Baptist pastor, televangelist, and conservative activist
James the Justearly leader of the Jerusalem Church of the Apostolic Age
John the Baptistitinerant preacher active in the area of Jordan River in the early 1st century AD
Jiddu KrishnamurtiIndian philosopher, speaker and writer
Adrian RogersAmerican Southern Baptist pastor and conservative author

Science and exploration
Buzz AldrinAmerican former astronaut, engineer, and fighter pilot
John Wesley PowellAmerican geologist, U.S. army soldier, and explorer, best known as the leader of the first scientific expedition into the Grand Canyon.

Sports
Tony AdamsEnglish football manager and former professional player
Dick AdvocaatDutch former football player and coach
Nathan AkéDutch football player
Ludwig AugustinssonSwedish professional footballer
Gareth BaleWelsh footballer
Don BradmanAustralian international cricketer
Trevor Brookingformer England international footballer, manager, pundit and football administrator
Djibril CisséFrench professional footballer
Johnny ChanChinese-American professional poker player
Graham Cornesformer Australian rules footballer, coach, and media personality
Owen CoyleScottish professional football manager and former player
Bryan Danielson American professional wrestler
Christopher Del BoscoAmerican-born, Canadian freestyle skier
Bhuvneshwar KumarIndian international cricketer and a former limited overs vice captain
Cristiano RonaldoPortuguese footballer
Neville Southallretired Welsh footballer

Theatre, film, and television
Simon AmstellBritish comedian and television presenter
Guillermo ArriagaMexican author, screenwriter, director and producer
Amitabh BachchanIndian actor, film producer, television host, occasional playback singer and former politician
Jason BatemanAmerican actor, director, and producer
Kate Beckinsale  English actress and model
Ron BenningtonAmerican radio personality and comedian
John BoyegaEnglish actor
Frankie BoyleScottish comedian and writer
Russell BrandEnglish comedian, actor, radio host and YouTuber
Gerard ButlerScottish actor and film producer
Jim CarreyCanadian-American actor and comedian
Kim CattrallBritish and Canadian actress
Dan CastellanetaAmerican actor, comedian, and screenwriter
Billy ConnollyScottish actor, retired comedian, artist, writer, musician, and presenter
Dane CookAmerican stand-up comedian and film actor
Bradley CooperAmerican actor and filmmaker
Tom CruiseAmerican actor and producer
Kristin DavisAmerican actress and producer
Craig FergusonScottish-American comedian, actor, writer, and television host
Jane FondaAmerican actress, activist, and former fashion model
Michael J. FoxCanadian-American retired actor.
Laura FraserScottish actress 
Freddie FrintonEnglish comedian
Anthony HopkinsWelsh actor
Sam HydeAmerican comedian
Gillian JacobsAmerican actress and director
Penn JilletteAmerican magician, entertainer, and member of Penn and Teller
John Larroquette -- American actor
Ewan McGregorScottish actor
Brennan Lee Mulligan - American writer and performer
Gary OldmanEnglish actor and filmmaker
Daniel RadcliffeEnglish actor
Martin ShawEnglish actor
TellerAmerican magician, entertainer, and member of Penn and Teller

See also
Alcoholics Anonymous
Blue ribbon badge
Catch-my-Pal
Christianity and alcohol
List of Temperance organizations
Theobald Mathew (temperance reformer)
Native American temperance activists
Pioneer Total Abstinence Association
Sobriety
Straight edge
Temperance bar
Woman's Christian Temperance Union

References

External links

Asceticism
Intentional living
Lifestyles
Temperance movement
Religion and alcohol